Holland v. Florida, 560 U.S. 631 (2010), was a United States Supreme Court case in which the Court held that the statute of limitations under the Antiterrorism and Effective Death Penalty Act is subject to equitable tolling in appropriate cases.

Background 
The case arose from a prosecution for the murder of police officer Scott Winters and the sexual assault of Thelma Johnson by Albert Holland.

On July 29, 1990, Holland attacked Johnson in Pompano Beach, Florida, rendering her semiconscious and inflicting severe head wounds. He ran off after a witness interrupted the attack, but was later found by K-9 patrol officer Scott Winters of the Pompano Beach Police Department. Holland grabbed Winters's gun and fatally shot Winters in the groin and lower stomach. Holland was later convicted of first-degree murder, armed robbery, attempted sexual battery, and attempted first-degree murder.

Opinion of the Court 
Associate Justice Stephen Breyer authored the majority opinion.

See also 
 List of United States Supreme Court cases, volume 560

References

External links
 

United States Supreme Court cases
United States Supreme Court cases of the Roberts Court
2010 in United States case law
Pompano Beach, Florida